Amakusaichthys is an extinct genus of ichthyodectiform fish which lived during the Late Cretaceous, known from only one species A. goshouraensis. Fossils are known from Kumamoto Prefecture in Japan.

Discovery 
Fossils were discovered in 2012 from construction site in Goshoura, Amakusa. This site is later considered to belong to Hinoshima Formation of the Himenoura Group. It was the first discovery of marine ichthyodectform fish described from Asia in detail, while other ichthyodectiform fish from Asia (three genera belong to Chuhsiungichthyidae) are from non-marine environment.

Description 
It is characterized by its long snout and small mouth and teeth. Multiple specimens are found overlapped in one place, suggesting its schooling ecology.

Classification 
Amakusaichthys was not assigned to any family in original description. However, characters suggested that it was related to Heckelichthys. In 2021, it was assigned to Bardackichthyidae, alongside Heckelichthys and Bardackichthys.

References 

Ichthyodectiformes
Prehistoric ray-finned fish genera
Santonian life
Santonian genus extinctions
Late Cretaceous fish of Asia
Fossil taxa described in 2018